Lignobrycon myersi is a species of characiform fish endemic to Brazil where it occurs in the Rio do Braço system.  It is the only member of its genus.

References
 

Characiformes

Fish of South America
Fish of Brazil
Endemic fauna of Brazil